The National AIDS Research Institute (abbreviated to NARI) is a research institute, run by Indian Council of Medical Research (ICMR), the apex body in India for the formulation, coordination and promotion of biomedical research. It was founded in 1992 with the purpose to provide leadership in biomedical research on HIV/AIDS in India. It is located in Bhosari, Pune, India. The current director of NARI is Dr Sheela Godbole.

See also 

 National AIDS Control Organisation
 HIV/AIDS in India

References

External links 
 Official website

HIV/AIDS research organisations
HIV/AIDS in India
Government agencies established in 1992
1992 establishments in Maharashtra
Organisations based in Pune
Ministry of Health and Family Welfare